The 2011–12 Skeleton World Cup is a multi race tournament over a season for skeleton. The season started on 2 December 2011 in Igls, Austria and ended on 11 February 2012 in Calgary, Alberta, Canada. The World Cup is organised by the FIBT who also run World Cups and Championships in bobsleigh. This season is sponsored by Viessmann.

Calendar 
Below is the schedule of the 2011/12 season

Results

Men

Women

Standings

Men

Women

See also
 FIBT World Championships 2012

References

External links 
 FIBT

Skeleton World Cup
Skeleton World Cup, 2011-12
Skeleton World Cup, 2011-12